Devdas is a Bengali novel by Sarat Chandra Chattopadhyay, first published in 1917 and adapted as a film many times.

Devdas may also refer to:
 Devdas (1928 film), silent film version of the novel. directed by Naresh Mitra
 Devdas (1935 film), Bengali version of the novel, directed by Pramathesh Barua
 Devdas (1936 film), Hindi version of the novel, directed by Pramathesh Barua
 Devdas (1937 film), Assamese version of the novel, directed by Pramathesh Barua
 Devdas (1955 film), Hindi version of the novel, directed by Bimal Roy
 Devdas (1965 film), Urdu film
 Devdas (1979 film), Bengali version of the novel, directed by Dilip Roy
 Devdas (1982 film), Bengali version of the novel, directed by Chashi Nazrul Islam
 Devdas (2002 Hindi film), Hindi version of the novel, directed by Sanjay Leela Bhansali
 Devdas (2002 Bengali film), Bengali version of the novel, directed by Shakti Samanta
 Devdas (2013 film), Bengali version of the novel, directed by Chashi Nazrul Islam
 Devdas (2018 film), a Telugu language film directed by Sreeram Aditya

Persons
 Devdas Gandhi (1900–1957), Indian journalist, son of Mohandas Karamchand Gandhi
 Devdas Chakraborty (1933–2008), Bangladesh artist
 Devdas Apte (born 1934), Indian politician
 Devdas Chhotray (born 1955), Indian writer
 Mujibur Rahman Devdas (1929/30-2020), Bangladesh activist

See also 
 Dev.D, a 2009 postmodern take on the novel by director Anurag Kashyap starring Abhay Deol, Mahi Gill and Kalki Koechlin
 Devadas (disambiguation)
 Devadasu (disambiguation)